Anthony David Junior Elanga (born 27 April 2002) is a Swedish professional footballer who plays as a winger for  club Manchester United and the Sweden national team.

Elanga joined the Manchester United youth system aged 12 and won the Jimmy Murphy Young Player of the Year award in 2020. He made his senior debut for the club in a Premier League game against Leicester City in May 2021. He represented Sweden at under-17, under-19 and under-21 levels, before making his senior national team debut in 2022.

Biography
Elanga was born in the Hyllie ward of Malmö (now part of Väster), Sweden, when his father Joseph Elanga was playing for Malmö FF. He is fluent in three languages: Swedish, English and French.

Club career

Manchester United

Youth
After playing for IF Elfsborg and Malmö FF in Sweden, Elanga's family moved to England and settled in Manchester. Elanga briefly played for local club Hattersley, and was scouted by both Manchester City and Manchester United before joining United at the age of 12.

Elanga made his debut for the Manchester United under-18s at the age of 15 in a 2–1 away defeat to Liverpool in April 2018. He signed as an academy scholar at Manchester United in July 2018, and scored four goals in 22 appearances in his first full season playing for the Under-18s.

The following season, Elanga played twice for the Under-21s in the EFL Trophy, both as a substitute. He finished the COVID-shortened season as the Under-18s' top scorer in the league with 7 goals in 9 appearances, and won the Jimmy Murphy Young Player of the Year award. He played four times for the club's under-21 side in the 2020–21 EFL Trophy, scoring twice.

2020–21 season
Elanga made his first-team debut for United in a pre-season friendly against Aston Villa ahead of the 2020–21 Premier League season; he came on as a substitute for Marcus Rashford in the 75th minute of a 1–0 defeat. After signing a new long-term contract with the club in March 2021, Elanga was called up to the first team for the 2020–21 UEFA Europa League quarter-final matches against Granada in April 2021, but was an unused substitute in both legs, as well as in the second leg of the semi-final against Roma on 6 May. He made his competitive debut for the club on 11 May in a Premier League match against Leicester City. Elanga was replaced by Marcus Rashford in the 66th minute as United lost 2–1.

Elanga started once again, away to Wolverhampton Wanderers on the final day of the league season and scored his first senior Manchester United goal after just 13 minutes.

2021–22 season

Elanga scored his second league goal for Manchester United on 19 January 2022 in a 3–1 away win against Brentford, his first of the season. On 4 February that year, Elanga missed his team's last penalty in a 8–7 shootout against Middlesbrough during their FA Cup tie, knocking Manchester United out of the Cup for the season. In the aftermath of the game, Elanga was subjected to racially abusive messages on social media. On 20 February, in a game against Leeds United, Elanga was hit on the head by an object thrown at him by a spectator. Minutes before the end of the game Elanga scored his second league goal of the season. On 23 February, Elanga scored his first UEFA Champions League goal against Atlético Madrid in the Round of 16 first leg, the final score was 1–1.

International career
Elanga was eligible to play for Sweden, Cameroon or England at international level. He has represented Sweden at under-17, under-19, under-21 and senior levels.

Elanga played five times for the Sweden under-17 team and scored two goals, both against France in the 2019 UEFA European Under-17 Championship. He played his first game for the Sweden under-21 team and scored one goal in a friendly against Finland on 3 June 2021.

Elanga chose to represent Sweden at a senior level, citing being born and having spent the majority of his life there, as well as the country meaning a lot to him as the reasons behind his decision. He was named in the international squad of Janne Andersson for the World Cup qualifiers against the Czech Republic in March 2022, where he also made his debut as a late-game substitute.

Elanga scored his first goal at senior international level on 5 June 2022 in a 1–2 loss against Norway in a 2022–23 UEFA Nations League B game.

Career statistics

Club

International

Scores and results list Sweden's goal tally first, score column indicates score after each Elanga goal.

Honours
Manchester United
UEFA Europa League runner-up: 2020–21

Individual
Jimmy Murphy Young Player of the Year: 2019–20

References

External links

Profile at the Manchester United F.C. website
Profile at the Swedish Football Association website

2002 births
Living people
Footballers from Malmö
Swedish footballers
Sweden youth international footballers
Sweden under-21 international footballers
Association football wingers
Manchester United F.C. players
Premier League players
Swedish expatriate footballers
Expatriate footballers in England
Swedish expatriate sportspeople in England
Swedish people of Cameroonian descent
Swedish sportspeople of African descent